Martina is the most popular surname in Curaçao. It may refer to:

 Churandy Martina (born 1984), Curaçaoan athlete
 Cuco Martina (born 1989), Dutch-Curaçaoan football player
 Derwin Martina (born 1994), Dutch-Curaçaoan football player
 Don Martina (born 1935), Curaçaoan politician
 Federico Martina (born 1992), Argentine volleyball player
 Gerry Martina (1928–1990), Irish wrestler
 Giovanni Martina (born 1987), Italian football player
 Hemayel Martina (1990–2011), Curaçaoan poet
 Javier Martina (born 1987), Curaçaoan-Dutch footballer
 Joe Martina (1889–1962), American baseball player
 Jurensley Martina (born 1993), Curaçaoan football player
 Marco Martina Rini (born 1990), Italian football player
 Maurizio Martina (born 1978), Italian politician
 Silvano Martina (born 1953), Italian football player
 Steven Martina (born 1961), Curaçaoan politician and businessman

See also
 Martina (given name)

References

Matronymic surnames